The Norwich Cropper is a breed of fancy pigeon developed over many years of selective breeding. The Norwich Cropper along with other varieties of domesticated pigeons are all descendants from the rock pigeon (Columba livia). The Norwich Cropper is thought to have been developed from a breed called the Oploper and is of Dutch origin.

See also 
List of pigeon breeds

References

Pigeon breeds
Pigeon breeds originating in the Netherlands